Robert Hall (born December 30, 1970) is an American football quarterback and wide receiver who played in the Canadian Football League (CFL) and Arena Football League (AFL). As of 8/25/22, he is the offensive coordinator for Keller Central High school.

Career 
Hall played for the Shreveport Pirates of the CFL, and the Texas Terror / Houston ThunderBears, Indiana Firebirds, Carolina Cobras and Grand Rapids Rampage of the AFL. He also played for the Houston Outlaws in the short-lived Regional Football League in 1999. Hall played college football at Texas Tech. He was selected to the Texas Tech Athletic Hall of Fame in 2008.

References

1970 births
Living people
Players of American football from Dallas
Players of Canadian football from Dallas
American football quarterbacks
Canadian football quarterbacks
American football wide receivers
Texas Tech Red Raiders football players
Shreveport Pirates players
Texas Terror players
Houston ThunderBears players
Indiana Firebirds players
Carolina Cobras players
Grand Rapids Rampage players
Regional Football League players